Laura Solari ( Camaur; 5 January 1913 – 13 September 1984) was an Italian film actress.

Early and personal life

Laura Camaur was born on 5 January 1913, in Trieste, then part of Austria-Hungary. She was the daughter of sculptor and artist Antonio Camaur (1875-1919) and his wife, Maria Taucer. In addition to being prominent in Triestine art and intellectual circles, Antonio Camaur was a prominent Irredentist and advocated annexation of Trieste by Italy.

In late 1915, Camaur went into exile because of his pro-Italian sympathies, and Laura lived in Northern Italy until her family's return to Trieste in 1919.

After World War I, Laura Camaur came under the tutelage of the Taucer family who sent her to be educated in Vienna. In 1930, she married an older Hungarian army officer, Oscar Szemere, but the couple separated after his business failed. They were divorced in Reno, Nevada, in 1940. Camaur later married Arthur Roper Caldbeck, a colonel in the British Army.

Film career
Camaur was spotted by a talent scout, who was taken by her beauty, at a function at the La Scala theater in Milan. She was recruited as a motion picture actress by the fledgling Italian film industry and acquired the stage name "Laura Solari".  Beginning with Regina della Scala in 1936, she appeared in 30 films between 1936 and 1969. Solari participated in the legitimate stage in Trieste's Nuovo Teatro. She also appeared on television in programs such as the 1955 drama television series Police Call.

Solari retired in 1969 and moved to Switzerland. She died in Bellinzona, Ticino, Switzerland on 13 September 1983, survived by three sons.

Partial filmography

 Queen of the Scala (1937)
 Il destino in tasca (1938)
 The Cuckoo Clock (1938) - Elvira
 La sposa dei re (1938) - Giulia Clary
 No Man's Land (1939) - Grazia
 A Wife in Danger (1939) - Michelina, la camiera
 Bionda sotto chiave (1939) - Aurora, la telefonista
 We Were Seven Widows (1939) - Anna Calcini
 Una lampada alla finestra (1940) - Vianella
 Validità giorni dieci (1940) - Clara Naldieri
 Don Pasquale (1940) - Norina
 Orizzonte dipinto (1941) - La moglie dell'attore moderno
 Ridi pagliaccio (1941) - Anna Alessandri
 Everything for Gloria (1941) - Regine Möbius
 The Thing About Styx (1942) - Julia Sander
 The Red Terror (1942) - Olga Feodorowna
 Luisa Sanfelice (1942) - Luisa Sanfelice
 A Living Statue (1943) - Luisa / Rita
 La maschera e il volto (1943) - Savina
 Il matrimonio segreto (1943)
 Il vento m'ha cantato una canzone (1947) - Laura
 Without a Flag (1951)
 The World Condemns Them (1953) - Signora Balestra
 Roman Holiday (1953) - Hennessy's Secretary
 Vacanze alla baia d'argento (1961) - Lia Moriconi
 The Return of Doctor Mabuse (1961) - Mrs. Pizarro
 Romulus and Remus (1961) - Rea Silvia
 The Corsican Brothers (1961) - Luisa Dupont
 Bandits in Milan (1968) - Tuccio's Mother
 Revenge (1969) - Mrs. Killenberg (final film role)

References

External links

Photographs and literature

1913 births
1984 deaths
Italian film actresses
Actors from Trieste
People from Bellinzona
Italian expatriates in Switzerland
20th-century Italian actresses